Christian Orlainsky (born 27 February 1962) is an Austrian former alpine skier who competed in the 1980 Winter Olympics.

Career
In 1980 he finished 13th in the Olympic giant slalom event. He also competed in the slalom competition but did not finish the race. In 1981 he won his only world cup giant slalom in Ebnat-Kappel and finished sixth in the giant slalom world cup.

References

External links
 
 

1962 births
Living people
Austrian male alpine skiers
Olympic alpine skiers of Austria
Alpine skiers at the 1980 Winter Olympics
People from Bludenz District
Sportspeople from Vorarlberg
20th-century Austrian people